The State Register of Heritage Places is maintained by the Heritage Council of Western Australia. , 71 places are heritage-listed in the Shire of Carnamah, of which one is on the State Register of Heritage Places, the Macpherson Homestead. The homestead, which was State Heritage-listed in April 1995, dates back to 1870.

List

State Register of Heritage Places
The Western Australian State Register of Heritage Places, lists the following state registered place within the Shire of Carnamah:

Shire of Carnamah heritage-listed places
The following places are heritage listed in the Shire of Carnamah but are not State registered:

References

Carnamah
Mid West (Western Australia)